Crabapple Creek is a stream in Ray County in the U.S. state of Missouri. It is a tributary of Wakenda Creek.

Crabapple Creek was so named on account of crabapple timber in the area.

See also
List of rivers of Missouri

References

Rivers of Ray County, Missouri
Rivers of Missouri